The England women's cricket team played against Australia women's cricket team in January and February 2022 to contest the Women's Ashes. The tour consisted of one Women's Test match, three Women's One Day Internationals (WODIs), and three Women's Twenty20 Internationals (WT20Is). A points-based system was used across all three formats of the tour. Australia were the defending champions, after they won the previous series 12–4 in the points-based system. On 17 January 2022, it was announced that the Decision Review System (DRS) would be used for the first time in the Women's Ashes.

As well as the international matches, the respective A teams also played three 20-over and three limited overs matches against each other. On 21 July 2021, Cricket Australia confirmed the fixtures for the A team matches. It was the first time that the England A women's team toured Australia with the England women's team. On 6 January 2022, the tour schedule was brought forward by one week, due to the quarantine requirements in New Zealand for the 2022 Women's Cricket World Cup.

Australia won the opening WT20I match by nine wickets, with Tahlia McGrath making an unbeaten 91 runs and taking three wickets. The next two WT20I matches were both impacted by the weather, with only 4.1 overs being bowled in the second match, and no play at all taking place in the third. Therefore, Australia took a 4–2 lead in the points-based system going into the one-off Women's Test match.

The one-off Test match was drawn, after England were set a target of 257 from 48 overs to win on the final day. Described as one of the best Test matches in women's cricket, England required 45 runs to win from ten overs with seven wickets remaining. England finished the match with 245 runs for the loss of nine wickets, just twelve runs short of victory. England captain Heather Knight was named the player of the match for her century in the first innings and match aggregate of 216 runs, with Australia leading the points-based system 6–4 heading into the WODI matches.

Australia won the first WODI match by 27 runs, taking an unassailable lead in the points-based system and retaining the Women's Ashes. Australia won the final two WODI matches, to remain unbeaten during the series, and finished the tour 12–4 winners on points. Australia's Tahlia McGrath was named the Player of the Series, after scoring 225 runs and taking 11 wickets.

Squads

Ahead of the series, Australia's Beth Mooney suffered a fractured jaw in a training session. As a result, Grace Harris was added to the Australia's Ashes squad, and Courtney Webb was added to the Australia A squad. For the opening A team match, Ashes squad members Hannah Darlington represented Australia A, and Charlie Dean, Tash Farrant, Anya Shrubsole and Mady Villiers all represented England A. On 23 January 2022, Australia's Tayla Vlaeminck was ruled out of the rest of the series due to a stress fracture in her right foot. Two days later, as a result of Vlaeminck's injury, Stella Campbell was added to Australia's squad ahead of the one-off Test match. On the same day, Lauren Bell was added to England's squad for the Test match. Emma Lamb was added to England's WODI squad from the A Team for the final match of the tour.

Warm-up matches

Tour matches

20-over matches

50-over matches

WT20I series

1st WT20I

2nd WT20I

3rd WT20I

Only WTest

WODI series

1st WODI

2nd WODI

3rd WODI

References

External links
 Series home at Cricket Australia
 Series home at ESPN Cricinfo
 Series home (A Team) at ESPN Cricinfo

Women's international cricket tours of Australia
2022 in Australian cricket
2022 in English cricket
International cricket competitions in 2021–22
Australia 2021–22
2022 in women's cricket
The Women's Ashes